Raf De La Torre (14 February 1905 –15 July 1975) was a British actor who was a member of the BBC Repertory Company.

Born in 1905 in Paris, France as Rafael De La Torre, he appeared in the films The Pickwick Papers (1952), Italian Attaché in Penny Princess (1952),  Filibert in Moulin Rouge (1952), the Chief Justice in The Golden Coach (1952), Wicked as They Come (1956), Mr Petheridge in The Strange Awakening (1958), Grave Robber in The Flesh and the Fiends (1960), Monsieur Le Guestier in There's a Girl in My Soup (1970), Charles, Cardinal of Lorraine in Mary, Queen of Scots (1971), and the King of Swobodia in S*P*Y*S (1974).

He played Mr Quelch in the television series Billy Bunter of Greyfriars School (1955). Other television roles included Durracq in The Count of Monte Cristo (1956), Ali in Ghost Squad (1963), Orator in Sergeant Cork (1964), Senior Judge in the Doctor Who episode The Keys of Marinus (1964), Belanger/Torres in The Troubleshooters (1969-1970), Count Guiccioli in Biography (1970), John Dee in Elizabeth R (1971), Prince Oblonsky in The Rivals of Sherlock Holmes (1971), and Etienne Le Blanc in The Regiment (1972).

Torre's stage appearances included Christ in The Just Vengeance (1946) by Dorothy L. Sayers, and in André Obey's  play Frost at Midnight (1963) at the Hampstead Theatre Club.

He died on 15 July 1975 in London, England aged 70.

Filmography

References

External links

1905 births
1975 deaths
British male stage actors
British male television actors
British male film actors
20th-century British male actors
French emigrants to the United Kingdom